Antonio García-Bellido y García de Diego ForMemRS (born 30 April 1936 in  Madrid) is a Spanish developmental biologist. His ideas and new approaches to the problem of development have been followed and pursued by many researchers worldwide. He is Research Professor at the Spanish National Research Council since 1974.

References

Foreign Members of the Royal Society
1936 births
People from Madrid
Spanish biologists
Living people
Foreign associates of the National Academy of Sciences
Developmental biologists